Alexander is a 2004 epic historical drama film based on the life of the ancient Macedonian general and king Alexander the Great. It was directed by Oliver Stone and starred Colin Farrell. The film's original screenplay derived in part from the book Alexander the Great, published in 1973 by the University of Oxford historian Robin Lane Fox. After release, while it performed well in Europe, the American critical reaction was negative. It grossed $167 million worldwide against a $155 million budget, thus making it a commercial failure.

Four versions of the film exist, the initial theatrical cut and three home video director's cuts: the "Director's Cut" in 2005, the "Final Cut" in 2007, and the "Ultimate Cut" in 2014. The two earlier DVD versions of Alexander ("director's cut" version and the theatrical version) sold over 3.5 million copies in the United States. Oliver Stone's third version, Alexander Revisited: The Final Cut (2007), sold nearly a million copies and became one of the highest-selling catalog items from Warner Bros.

Plot
The story begins around 285 BC, with Ptolemy I Soter, who narrates throughout the film. Alexander grows up with his mother Olympias and his tutor Aristotle, where he finds interest in love, honor, music, exploration, poetry and military combat. His relationship with his father, Philip II of Macedon, is destroyed when Philip marries Attalus's niece, Eurydice. Alexander insults Philip after disowning Attalus as his kinsman, which results in Alexander's banishment from Philip's palace.

After Philip is assassinated, Alexander becomes King of Macedonia. Ptolemy mentions Alexander's punitive campaign in which he razes Thebes, also referring to the later burning of Persepolis, then gives an overview of Alexander's west-Persian campaign, including his declaration as the son of Zeus by the Oracle of Amun at Siwa Oasis, his great battle against the Persian Emperor Darius III in the Battle of Gaugamela, and his eight-year campaign across Asia.

Also seen are Alexander's private relationships with his childhood friend Hephaestion, Bagoas, and later his wife, Roxana. Hephaestion compares Alexander to Achilles, to which Alexander replies that Hephaestion must be his Patroclus (Achilles' lover). When Hephaestion mentions that Patroclus died first, Alexander pledges that, if Hephaestion should die first, he will follow him into the afterlife (as Achilles had done for Patroclus). Hephaestion shows extensive jealousy when he sees Alexander with Roxana, and deep sadness when he marries her, going so far as to attempt to keep her away from him after Alexander murders Cleitus the Black in India.

After initial objection from his soldiers, Alexander convinces them to join him in his final and bloodiest battle, the Battle of Hydaspes. He is severely injured with an arrow but survives and is celebrated. Later on, Hephaestion succumbs to an unknown illness either by chance or perhaps poison, speculated in the film to be typhus carried with him from India. Alexander, full of grief and anger, distances himself from his wife, despite her pregnancy, believing that she has killed Hephaestion. He dies less than three months after Hephaestion, in the same manner, keeping his promise that he would follow him. On his deathbed, Bagoas grieves as Alexander's generals begin to split up his kingdom and fight over the ownership of his body.

The story then returns to 285 BC, where Ptolemy admits to his scribe that he, along with all the other officers, had indeed poisoned Alexander just to spare themselves from any future conquests or consequences. However, he has it recorded that Alexander died due to illness compounding his overall weakened condition. He then goes on to end his memoirs with praise to Alexander.

The movie then ends with the note that Ptolemy's memoirs of Alexander were eventually burned, lost forever with the Library of Alexandria.

Cast

 Colin Farrell as Alexander
 Jessie Kamm as child Alexander
 Connor Paolo as young Alexander
 Angelina Jolie as Queen Olympias
 Val Kilmer as King Philip II
 Anthony Hopkins as old Ptolemy
 Elliot Cowan as adult Ptolemy
 Robert Earley as young Ptolemy
 Jared Leto as Hephaestion
 Patrick Carroll as young Hephaestion
 Rosario Dawson as Roxana
 Christopher Plummer as Aristotle
 David Bedella as scribe Cadmus
 Fiona O'Shaughnessy as nurse
 Brian Blessed as wrestling trainer
 Gary Stretch as Cleitus the Black
 John Kavanagh as Parmenion
 Nick Dunning as Attalus
 Marie Meyer as Eurydice
 Mick Lally as horse seller
 Joseph Morgan as Philotas
 Ian Beattie as Antigonus
 Jonathan Rhys Meyers as Cassander
 Morgan Christopher Ferris as young Cassander
 Denis Conway as Nearchus
 Peter Williamson as young Nearchus
 Neil Jackson as Perdiccas
 Aleczander Gordon as young Perdiccas
 Garrett Lombard as Leonnatus
 Chris Aberdein as Polyperchon
 Rory McCann as Craterus
 Tim Pigott-Smith as omen reader
 Raz Degan as Darius
 Erol Sander as Persian prince
 Stéphane Ferrara as Bessus, Bactrian commander
 Tadhg Murphy as dying soldier
 Francisco Bosch as Bagoas
 Annelise Hesme as Stateira
 Toby Kebbell as Pausanias of Orestis
 Laird Macintosh as Greek officer
 Féodor Atkine as Roxana's father
 Bin Bunluerit as King Porus of India
 Jaran Ngramdee as Indian prince
 Brian McGrath as doctor
 Oliver Stone (uncredited) as Macedonian soldier at Zeus Statue

Production

The first mention of the film was in October 2001 by Initial Entertainment Group.

Locations

Library of Alexandria: Shepperton Studios, London, England
Pella/Babylon/Indian palaces and myths cave: Pinewood Studios, London, England
 Alexandria (effect back plate): Malta
 Temple of Pallas Athena, Mieza and Macedonian horse market: Essaouira, Morocco
 Gaugamela: desert near Marrakech, Morocco
 Babylon gates: Marrakech, Morocco
 Bactrian fortress: Lower Atlas Mountains, Morocco
Hindu Kush (effect back plate): Ouarzazate, Morocco
 Macedonian amphitheater: Morocco
 Hyphasis: Mekong, northeastern Ubon Ratchathani Province, Thailand
 Hydaspes: Central Botanical Garden, Amphoe Mueang, Saraburi Province, Thailand

Controversies
A group of 25 Greek lawyers initially threatened to file a lawsuit against both Stone and the Warner Bros film studio for what they claimed was an inaccurate portrayal of history. "We are not saying that we are against gays," said Yannis Varnakos, "but we are saying that the production company should make it clear to the audience that this film is pure fiction and not a true depiction of the life of Alexander". After an advance screening of the film, the lawyers announced that they would not pursue such a course of action.

At the British premiere of the film, Stone blamed "raging fundamentalism in morality" for the film's US box-office failure. He argued that American critics and audiences had blown the issue of Alexander's sexuality out of proportion. The criticism prompted him to make significant changes to the film for its DVD release, whose cover characterizes them as making it "faster paced, more action-packed".

Criticism by historians
Alexander attracted critical scrutiny from historians with regard to historical accuracy.

According to Lloyd Llewellyn-Jones, Professor of Ancient History at Cardiff University: "Oliver Stone's movie Alexander (2004) displays all the familiar Orientalist notions about the inferiority and picturesqueness of Eastern societies. So much so, indeed, that in terms of its portrayal of East–West relationships, Alexander has to be seen as a stale cultural statement and a worn-out reflection of the continuing Western preoccupation with an imaginary exotic Orient."

Persian history expert Kaveh Farrokh questioned the omission of the burning of Persepolis by Alexander and observed that, in the film, "Greek forces are typically shown as very organised, disciplined, and so on, and what's very disturbing is, when the so-called Persians are shown confronting the Macedonians, you see them turbaned. Turbans are not even a Persian item [...] Their armies are totally disorganized. What is not known is that the Persians actually had uniforms. They marched in discipline [sic], and music was actually used..."

Oliver Stone has, in his various commentaries in the film's DVD, defended many of the most glaring historical issues in regard to Persian and Indian history by claiming that he had no time or resources to portray accurately a multitude of battles at the expense of storytelling. He goes into great detail explaining how he merged all the major aspects of the Battle of the Granicus and the Battle of Issus into the Battle of Gaugamela, as well as heavily simplifying the Battle of Hydaspes into a straightforward clash, while merging the near-death of Alexander with the siege of Malli. In a taped discussion at the Oxford Union, Oliver Stone stated regarding his presentation of the Battle of Gaugamela: "I've been told by many historians that the battle is as accurate as they've ever seen in any movie, ever, to what they think happened at the battle".

However, early-Greek-history ethnographer/analyst Angelos Chaniotis, of Princeton's Institute for Advanced Study—in summarizing the first three versions of the film as "a dramatisation, [rather than] a documentary"—nevertheless insists that, despite its imperfections, historians and history students "have a lot to learn" by "studying and reflecting upon" Stone's film. He concludes that, as a motion picture that "captures the Zeitgeist" (spirit of the times) of the "ancient Greek" era, "no film... can rival Oliver Stone's Alexander."

Reception

Box office
Alexander was released in 2,445 venues on 24 November 2004 and earned $13.7 million in its opening weekend, ranking sixth in the North American box office and second among the week's new releases. Upon closing on 1 February 2005, the film grossed $34.3 million domestically and $133 million overseas for a worldwide total of $167.3 million. Based on a $155 million production budget, as well as additional marketing costs, the film was a box-office bomb, with projected losses of as much as $71 million.

Critical reception
On Rotten Tomatoes the film holds an approval rating of 16% based on 206 reviews, with an average rating of 4.00/10. The website's critical consensus states: "Even at nearly three hours long, this ponderous, talky, and emotionally distant biopic fails to illuminate Alexander's life." On Metacritic, the film has a weighted average score of 39 out of 100, based on 42 critics, indicating "generally unfavorable reviews".

One of the principal complaints among American film critics was that Alexander resembled less an action-drama film than a history documentary. Roger Ebert of the Chicago Sun-Times, giving the film 2 out of 4 stars, wrote in his review, "[W]e welcome the scenes of battle, pomp and circumstance because at least for a time we are free of the endless narration of Ptolemy the historian."

Faint praise came from Todd McCarthy of Variety who wrote, "Oliver Stone's Alexander is at best an honorable failure, an intelligent and ambitious picture that crucially lacks dramatic flair and emotional involvement. Dry and academic where Troy (2004) was vulgar and willfully ahistorical".

Keith Uhlich of The A.V. Club named Alexander: The Ultimate Cut the tenth-best film of 2014.

Nominations
The film was nominated in six categories at the Golden Raspberry Awards in 2005: Worst Picture, Worst Actor (Colin Farrell), Worst Actress (Angelina Jolie) and Worst Director (Oliver Stone), Worst Supporting Actor (Val Kilmer) and Worst Screenplay, thereby becoming the second-most-nominated potential "Razzie" film of 2004; however, it won no awards. At the 2004 Stinkers Bad Movie Awards, it received nine nominations: Worst Picture, Worst Director (Stone), Worst Actor (Farrell), Worst Supporting Actress (both Jolie and Dawson), Worst Screenplay, Most Intrusive Musical Score, Worst Female Fake Accent (Dawson and Jolie, lumped into one nomination), and Least "Special" Special Effects. Its only wins were for Most Intrusive Musical Score and Worst Female Fake Accent.

Versions

Several versions of the film have been released, and these have generally been seen as improvements on the initial release version. Critic Peter Sobczynski said "The various expansions and rejiggerings have improved it immeasurably, and what was once a head-scratching mess has reformed into an undeniably fascinating example of epic cinema."

Theatrical cut (2004)
This is the film as it was originally released in theaters, with a running time of 175 minutes. It was released on DVD and is also available on Blu-ray in some territories.

Director's cut (2005)
Stone's director's cut was re-edited before the DVD release later in 2005. Stone removed seventeen minutes of footage and added nine back. This shortened the running time from 175 minutes to 167.

Alexander Revisited: The Final Unrated Cut (2007)
Stone also made an extended version of Alexander. "I'm doing a third version on DVD, not theatrical", he said, in an interview with Rope of Silicon. "I'm going to do a Cecil B. DeMille three-hour-45-minute thing; I'm going to go all out, put everything I like in the movie. He [Alexander] was a complicated man, it was a complicated story, and it doesn't hurt to make it longer and let people who loved the film [...] see it more and understand it more."

The extended version was released under the title of Alexander Revisited: The Final Unrated Cut on 27 February 2007. The two-disc set featured a new introduction by Stone. "Over the last two years," he said, "I have been able to sort out some of the unanswered questions about this highly complicated and passionate monarch – questions I failed to answer dramatically enough. This film represents my complete and last version, as it will contain all the essential footage we shot. I don't know how many film-makers have managed to make three versions of the same film, but I have been fortunate to have the opportunity because of the success of video and DVD sales in the world, and I felt, if I didn't do it now, with the energy and memory I still have for the subject, it would never quite be the same again. For me, this is the complete Alexander, the clearest interpretation I can offer."

The film is restructured into two acts with an intermission. Alexander: Revisited takes a more in-depth look at Alexander's life and his relationships with Olympias, Philip, Hephaestion, Roxana, and Ptolemy. The film has a running time of three hours and 34 minutes (214 minutes, about 40 minutes longer than the theatrical cut and almost 50 minutes longer than the first director's cut) and is presented in 2.40:1 anamorphic widescreen with English Dolby Digital 5.1 Surround audio. Beyond the new introduction with Stone, there are no other extras on the DVD except for a free coupon to the movie 300. The Blu-ray and HD-DVD releases both feature a variety of special features however, including two audio commentaries and a new featurette.

For seven years, it was the only version of the film available on Blu-ray, until the release of the Ultimate Cut, which also includes the Theatrical Cut.

Alexander: The Ultimate Cut (2014)
In November 2012, Stone revealed that he was working on a fourth cut of the film at Warner's request, and that this time around he would remove material, as he felt he had added in too much in the "Final Cut". The version, which is 206 minutes long, premiered on 3 July 2013 at the Karlovy Vary International Film Festival and Stone swears that no more versions will follow. 'Alexander: The Ultimate Cut (Tenth Anniversary Edition)' was released in the United States on 3 June 2014.

Soundtrack

See also
 Alexander the Great (disambiguation)
 Alexander (video game)
 Ishtar Gate of Babylon, Pergamon Museum, Berlin
 List of historical drama films

References

Bibliography
 G. Abel, Hollywood Reporter 390 (2 August – 8 August 2005), 11 (2005). 
 R. K. Bosley, "Warrior King", American Cinematographer 85:11, 36–40, 42–43, 45–46, 48–51 (2004); B. Bergery, "Timing Alexander", ibid. 44–45 (2004).
 T. Carver, "Oliver Stone's Alexander: Warner Bros. And Intermedia Films (2004)", Film & History 35:2, 83–84 (2005).
 G. Crowdus, "Dramatizing Issues That Historians Don't Address: An Interview with Oliver Stone", Cineaste 30:2 (Spring 2005), 12–23 (2005).
 D. Fierman, Entertainment Weekly 793 (19 November 2004), 26–32 (2004).
 M. Fleming, "Stone Redraws Battle Plans: Producer Admit 'Alexander' Missteps, but Hope International Release Proves Epically Successful", Variety 397:6 (27 December 2004 – 2 January 2005), 6 (2005).
 D. Gritten, "Fall Sneaks: Fearsome Phalanx: Executing His Vision of Grandeur, Oliver Stone Leads A Front Line of Powder-Keg Actors Across 3 Continents. What Could Go Wrong?", Los Angeles Times 12 September 2004, E21 (2004).
 A. Lane, "The Critics: The Current Cinema: War-Torn: Oliver Stone's 'Alexander'", The New Yorker 80:38 (6 December 2004), 125–127 (2004).
 R. Lane Fox, Alexander the Great (Penguin Books, London, 1973).
 
 I. Worthington, "Book Review: Europe: Ancient and Medieval: Alexander. Directed by Oliver Stone", The American Historical Review 110:2, 553 (2005).
 Radio Free Europe/Radio liberty,28 January 2005 "World: Oliver Stone's 'Alexander' Stirs Up Controversy" By Golnaz Esfandiari
 Dr. Kaveh Farrokh, The Alexander Movie: How are Iranians and Greeks Portrayed?

External links

 
 
 
 
 
 Alexander: Theatrical cut at Rotten Tomatoes
 Alexander: Director's cut  at Rotten Tomatoes
 Alexander Revisited: The Final Cut at Rotten Tomatoes
 Alexander: The Ultimate Cut  at Rotten Tomatoes
 

2000s action drama films
2000s American films
2000s British films
2000s French films
2000s German films
2000s English-language films
2000s historical drama films
2000s war drama films
2004 action drama films
2004 biographical drama films
2004 LGBT-related films
Action films based on actual events
American action drama films
American biographical drama films
American epic films
American historical action films
American historical drama films
American nonlinear narrative films
American war drama films
British drama films
British epic films
British historical action films
Classical war films
Cultural depictions of Aristotle
Drama films based on actual events
Dutch drama films
English-language Dutch films
English-language French films
English-language German films
English-language Italian films
Italian historical drama films
Epic films based on actual events
Fiction with unreliable narrators
Films about Alexander the Great
Films directed by Oliver Stone
Films produced by Jon Kilik
Films scored by Vangelis
Films set in Afghanistan
Films set in ancient Egypt
Films set in ancient Greece
Films set in ancient India
Films set in ancient Persia
Films set in India
Films set in Iran
Films set in Iraq
Films set in Lebanon
Films set in Pakistan
Films set in Syria
Films set in Turkey
Films set in the 3rd century BC
Films set in the 4th century BC
Films shot at Pinewood Studios
Films shot at Shepperton Studios
Films shot in Malta
Films shot in Morocco
Films shot in Thailand
Films with screenplays by Laeta Kalogridis
Films with screenplays by Oliver Stone
French historical drama films
German historical drama films
Gay-related films
Historical epic films
Incest in film
LGBT-related controversies in film
LGBT-related drama films
Male bisexuality in film
Sword and sandal films
War epic films
War films based on actual events
Warner Bros. films
Films set in Greece